Kolachi or Kulachi is a Baloch tribe in Karachi & in Dera Ismail Khan, Pakistan. The tribe originated from Kulanch, an area in the Makran region of Balochistan province. The tribe has since moved over to several cities in Sindh and its people can be found in regions such as District Ghotki, Sukkur, Moro, and Dadu. One of the prominent villages in Sindh goes by the name of Kolachi village located on the Indus Highway. There is also a city in District Dera Ismail Khan in the name of Kulachi which was previously occupied by Kulachi Baloch tribe.

Mai Kolachi 
Mai Kolachi is the most well-known member of the Kulachi Baloch tribe. She was a fisher who settled near the delta of the Indus River to start a community and gave the tribe her name.

The port of Kolachi was named after her. Mai Kolachi migrated from Makran and settled in the area presently known as Karachi. The word "Mai" is still used in Sindh, meaning "Respected Lady".

References

History of Karachi
Baloch tribes